Davide Tirelli (born 12 August 1966) is a retired Italian middle-distance runner who specialised in the 1500 metres. He represented his country at one outdoor and one indoor World Championships. In addition, he won a silver medal at the 1991 Summer Universiade.

International competitions

Personal bests
Outdoor
800 metres – 1:47.14 (Cagliari 1993)
1000 metres – 2:18.07 (Parma 1993)
1500 metres – 3:34.61 (Nice 1992)
3000 metres – 7:56.79 (Trento 1990)
Half marathon – 1:06:18 (Fusignano 2002)
Indoor
1500 metres – 3:47.63 (Seville 1991)

References

External links
 
 Davide Tirelli at All Athletics

Living people
1966 births
Italian male middle-distance runners
World Athletics Championships athletes for Italy
Universiade medalists in athletics (track and field)
Universiade silver medalists for Italy
Sportspeople from Verona
Medalists at the 1991 Summer Universiade
Competitors at the 1990 Goodwill Games
Athletes (track and field) at the 1991 Mediterranean Games
Athletes (track and field) at the 1993 Mediterranean Games
Mediterranean Games competitors for Italy